Mahmoud Hessabi museum is a museum located on a street of the same name in Tajrish neighborhood in Tehran.

History 
The Mahmoud Hessabi museum was founded for recognition of Mahmoud Hessabi's life-works.

See also 
Mahmoud Hessabi
Museum of the Islamic Era

References 
In memory of Iran's Father of Modern Physics, Mehrnews agency, 2015
Dr. Hessabi Museum, ToIran website

Museums in Tehran